Lithomyrtus is a genus of small trees and shrubs in the myrtle family, Myrtaceae. There are 11 species, native to the tropics of northern Australia and New Guinea:

Lithomyrtus cordata (A.J.Scott) N.Snow & Guymer - (Northern Territory)
Lithomyrtus densifolia  N.Snow & Guymer - (Northern Territory)
Lithomyrtus dunlopii  N.Snow & Guymer - (Northern Territory)
Lithomyrtus grandifolia  N.Snow & Guymer - (Northern Territory)
Lithomyrtus hypoleuca  F.Muell. ex N.Snow & Guymer - (Northern Territory, Queensland) 
Lithomyrtus kakaduensis  N.Snow & Guymer - (Northern Territory)
Lithomyrtus linariifolia  N.Snow & Guymer - (Northern Territory)
Lithomyrtus microphylla  (Benth.) N.Snow & Guymer (Queensland)
Lithomyrtus obtusa (Endl.) N.Snow & Guymer - beach myrtella (New Guinea, Queensland)
Lithomyrtus repens  N.Snow & Guymer - (Northern Territory)
Lithomyrtus retusa (Endl.) N.Snow & Guymer - (Western Australia, Northern Territory, Queensland)

The genus was formally described in 1857 by Victorian Government Botanist Ferdinand von Mueller.

References

Myrtaceae genera
Myrtaceae
Flora of New Guinea
Flora of Australia